Curtis Michael "Mike" Scaparrotti (born March 5, 1956) is a retired United States Army four-star general who last served as the commander of United States European Command. He concurrently served as NATO's Supreme Allied Commander Europe. Scaparrotti previously served as the director of the Joint Staff. Prior to his tour with the Joint Staff, Scaparrotti served as commander, International Security Assistance Force Joint Command and deputy commander, U.S. Forces – Afghanistan, the commanding general of I Corps and Joint Base Lewis-McChord, and the commanding general of the 82nd Airborne Division.

In addition, Scaparrotti served in key leadership positions at the tactical, operational, and strategic level of the United States military, including as director of operations, United States Central Command and as the 69th commandant of cadets at the United States Military Academy. He  commanded forces during Operations Iraqi Freedom, Enduring Freedom (Afghanistan), Support Hope (Zaire/Rwanda), Joint Endeavour (Bosnia-Herzegovina), and Assured Response (Liberia).

In 1978 Scaparrotti graduated from the United States Military Academy at West Point, New York. His military education includes the Infantry Officer Basic and Advanced Courses, Command and General Staff College, and the United States Army War College. He holds a master's degree in Administrative Education from the University of South Carolina.

Career
Scaparrotti's initial duty assignments were as a rifle and anti-tank platoon leader, operations officer and company commander in 3rd Battalion, 325th Infantry, 82nd Airborne Division at Fort Bragg, North Carolina. In 1984, Scaparrotti completed the infantry officer advanced course at Fort Benning, Georgia, followed by studies in Administrative Education at the University of South Carolina, where he earned his Master of Education degree.

Scaparrotti returned to West Point in 1985 where he was assigned as a tactical officer and the superintendent's aide-de-camp until 1988. After his assignment here, he continued his military studies at the U.S. Army Command and General Staff College at Fort Leavenworth, Kansas. By July 1989, Scaparrotti went on to serve with the 10th Mountain Division in Fort Drum, New York, where he was the operations officer for 1st Battalion, 87th Infantry Regiment and then moved to division headquarters as the chief of the operations branch.

From 1992 to 1994, Scaparrotti worked in Washington, D.C., at the Army Total Personnel Command and the Army Chief of Staff's office. In May 1994, Scaparrotti took command of 3rd Battalion, 325th Airborne Combat Team, Southern European Task Force in Vicenza, Italy, and in that time he commanded the battalion during Operations Support Hope in Zaire/Rwanda, Joint Endeavor in Bosnia-Herzegovina and Assured Response (1996) in Liberia.

Scaparrotti returned to Fort Drum in 1996 as the 10th Mountain Division's operations officer and from there he continued his studies at the U.S. Army War College, Carlisle Barracks. He served as the chief of Army Initiatives Group in the Deputy Chief of Staff's Office for Plans and Operations in Washington, D. C. in 1998. By 1999, Scaparrotti returned to Fort Bragg to command the 2nd Brigade, 82nd Airborne Division before he moved on to serve as the assistant deputy director for Joint Operations on the Joint Staff, Washington, D. C., from 2001 to 2003.

From July 2003 to July 2004, Scaparrotti served as the assistant division commander (Maneuver) for the 1st Armored Division during the Iraq War. From August 2004 to July 2006, Scaparrotti served as the 69th commandant of cadets, United States Military Academy, at West Point, New York. Thereafter, he was assigned as the director of operations (J3) for United States Central Command (CENTCOM), providing oversight to all military operations throughout the CENTCOM Area of Responsibility, including Iraq and Afghanistan, and also including operations in Somalia, at a critical phase in those missions.

Scaparrotti assumed command of the 82nd Airborne Division on October 1, 2008, and deployed the headquarters to Eastern Afghanistan where he served as the commanding general of Combined Joint Task Force 82 and Regional Command East.

On October 15, 2010, Scaparrotti assumed command of I Corps and Joint Base Lewis McChord (JBLM) at Fort Lewis, Washington.  While serving as I Corps commander, Scaparrotti served concurrently as commander, International Security Assistance Force Joint Command and deputy commander, U.S. Forces – Afghanistan from July 11, 2011 to June 12, 2012.  In July 2012, Scaparrotti took over as director of the Joint Staff.  He was succeeded as I Corps commander by Lieutenant General Robert B. Brown on July 3, 2012.

In August 2013, Scaparrotti took over command of U.S. forces in South Korea, replacing General James D. Thurman.  In April 2016, he was succeeded as USFK commander by General Vincent K. Brooks. In May 2016 he assumed duties as commander of European Command and as Supreme Allied Commander, Europe. In April 2018, Scaparotti met General Valery Gerasimov, Chief of the General Staff of the Armed Forces of the Russian Federation, under the auspices of the NATO-Russia Council, in Baku. This act represented the first attempt to build up a dialogue with Moscow after the Crimean crisis and Putin's declaration to empower Russian military capabilities. In May 2019 he was succeeded by General Tod D. Wolters.

Scaparrotti also sits on the Atlantic Council's board of directors.

Awards and decorations
Scaparrotti's awards and decorations include:

In May 2018, Scaparrotti was awarded the Distinguished Military Leadership Award of the Atlantic Council.
In October 2019, he received the America Award of the Italy-USA Foundation.

References

External links

|-

|-

|-

|-

|-

|-

|-

1956 births
American people of Italian descent
Commanders, United States Forces Korea
People from Logan, Ohio
Living people
NATO Supreme Allied Commanders
Recipients of the Defense Distinguished Service Medal
Recipients of the Defense Superior Service Medal
Recipients of the Humanitarian Service Medal
Recipients of the Legion of Merit
United States Army Command and General Staff College alumni
United States Army generals
United States Army War College alumni
University of South Carolina alumni